David Ruud (born January 21, 1980) is a former motorcycle speedway rider from Sweden who won 2003 Speedway World Cup with the Sweden national speedway team.

Career details

World Championships 

 Individual World Championship (Speedway Grand Prix)
 2002 - 38th place (2 points in one event)
 2003 - 32nd place (4 points in one event)
 Team World Championship (Speedway World Cup)
 2003 -  Vojens - World Champion (5 points)
 Individual U-21 World Championship
 2001 -  Peterborough - 7th place (8 points)

European Championships 

 Individual European Championship
 2002 -  Rybnik - 9th place (7 points)
 2004 -  Holsted - 11th place (6 points)
 2005 -  Lonigo - 7th place (9 points)

Domestic competitions 

 Team Polish Championship (Speedway Ekstraliga)
 2003 - Polish Champion

See also 
 Sweden national speedway team
 List of Speedway Grand Prix riders

References 

1980 births
Living people
Swedish speedway riders
Speedway World Cup champions